Mathur is a gram panchayat in the Palakkad district, state of Kerala, India. It is a local government organisation that serves the villages of Mathur-I and Mathur-II.

See also
P. R. G. Mathur

References 

Gram panchayats in Palakkad district